Charles Bentley may refer to:

Charles R. Bentley (1929–2017), Arctic geographer
Charles Eugene Bentley (1841–1905), American politician
Charles Edwin Bentley (1859–1929), American dentist
Charles Bentley (painter) (1806–1854), English painter
Dick Bentley (Charles Walter Bentley, 1907–1995), Australian comedian and actor
Chuck Bentley (born 1957), American chief executive officer for Crown Financial Ministries

See also
Bentley (disambiguation)